Yeşilyurt is a town and district of Malatya Province in the Eastern Anatolia region of Turkey. The mayor is Hacı Uğur Polat (AKP).

References

External links
District governor's official website 

Populated places in Malatya Province
Districts of Malatya Province
Towns in Turkey
Kurdish settlements in Turkey